Aspiculuris is a genus of nematodes belonging to the family Oxyuridae.

The species of this genus are found in Mediterranean, Northern America.

Species:

Aspiculuris aserbaidjanica 
Aspiculuris asiatica 
Aspiculuris dinniki 
Aspiculuris kazakstanica 
Aspiculuris schulzi 
Aspiculuris tetraptera 
Aspiculuris tschertkovi

References

Rhabditida
Rhabditida genera